Weston Schoolhouse is a historic one-room school building located at Weston in Schuyler County, New York.  It is a one-room, one story, gable roofed frame building built about 1870.  It was used as a school until 1940.

It was listed on the National Register of Historic Places in 1998.

References

One-room schoolhouses in New York (state)
Schoolhouses in the United States
School buildings on the National Register of Historic Places in New York (state)
School buildings completed in 1870
Buildings and structures in Schuyler County, New York
National Register of Historic Places in Schuyler County, New York